KMDZ is a radio station broadcasting on a frequency of 96.7 MHz on the FM band.  KMDZ is currently owned by Sangre de Cristo Broadcasting.  It features a classic hits format known as Classic Hitz Z 96 FM.

References

External links

MDZ (FM)
Radio stations established in 2000
2000 establishments in New Mexico